Hypotrachyna brevirhiza is a species of foliose lichen in the family Parmeliaceae. First described as a species of Parmelia by Syo Kurokawa in 1964, Mason Hale transferred it to the genus Hypotrachyna in 1975. It also occurs in southern South America, Africa, India, Indonesia, Papua New Guinea, Macquarie Island, and the Pacific.

References

brevirhiza
Lichen species
Lichens described in 1964
Lichens of Central America
Lichens of South America
Lichens of Africa
Lichens of Asia
Lichens of New Guinea
Lichens of Oceania
Taxa named by Syo Kurokawa
Lichens of the subantarctic islands